Sofiane Lamali (سفيان لامالي, born 31 January 1974) is an Algerian male handball player. He was a member of the Algeria men's national handball team. He was part of the  team at the 1996 Summer Olympics, playing five matches.

References

1974 births
Living people
Algerian male handball players
Handball players at the 1996 Summer Olympics
Olympic handball players of Algeria
Sportspeople from Algiers
21st-century Algerian people